The 1906 Chicago Maroons football team was an American football team that represented the University of Chicago during the 1906 college football season.  In their 15th season under head coach Amos Alonzo Stagg, the Maroons compiled a 4–1 record, finished in fourth place in the Western Conference, and outscored all opponents by a combined total of 175 to 17.

Schedule

Roster

 Head coach: Amos Alonzo Stagg (15th year at Chicago)

References

Chicago
Chicago Maroons football seasons
Chicago Maroons football